The 1958 North Dakota gubernatorial election was held on November 4, 1958. Incumbent Republican John E. Davis defeated Democratic nominee John F. Lord with 53.10% of the vote.

Primary elections
Primary elections were held on June 24, 1958.

Democratic primary

Candidates
John F. Lord, attorney
Art Ford Sr.

Results

Republican primary

Candidates
John E. Davis, incumbent Governor

Results

General election

Candidates
John E. Davis, Republican 
John F. Lord, Democratic

Results

References

1958
North Dakota
Gubernatorial
November 1958 events in the United States